In the Hindu epic Mahabharata, King Shalya (lit. pointed weapon) was the brother of Madri (mother of Nakula and Sahadeva), and the ruler of the Madra kingdom. Skilled with the mace and a formidable warrior, he was tricked by Duryodhana to fight the war on the side of the Kauravas. He was encouraged to serve as the charioteer of Karna by Yudhisthira to dissuade the former from combat. Shalya was an incredibly calm and deliberate fighter, his level-headedness and prowess in warfare making him a great warrior in spite of his slight build.

Becoming Pandu's brother-in-law

On his way to Hastinapura, King Pandu encountered Shalya's army. At parlay, Shalya and his general met with Pandu; Pandu was very impressed by Shalya's slight general and became friends. Bhishma, head of Pandu's family, learned of Shalya's beautiful sister, Mādrī and decided to arrange Pandu's second marriage with Madri. Shalya agreed and was gifted with gold and jewels from Hastinapura.

Attempt to make Nakula and Sahadeva his heirs

Years after Madri had decided to self-immolate herself, Shalya invited his nephews Nakula and Sahadeva to Madra, wishing to make them his heirs. On their eighteenth birthday, Shalya revealed his intention to the twins. Shalya argued that Nakula could be a king one day, instead of fourth-in-line to the throne of Hastinapura, provided that Yudhishthira would be named the crown prince. Nakula supposed that Shalya only wished to anoint Nakula and Sahadeva as his heirs because they were both children of deities, and that Shalya was rejecting his own children from the line of succession with this gambit. Nakula admitted that while Sahadeva and he staying with the Pandavas would give them no power, his brothers and Kunti genuinely loved him, and would never try to make Nakula and Sahadeva their pawns. After some deliberation, Nakula was convinced that Shalya had no ulterior motives. Sahadeva and he agreed to become the heirs to Shalya's throne, on the condition that they would always stay with the rest of the Pandavas.

Kurukshetra War

Falling prey to Duryodhana's trick
When Shalya heard of the impending Kurukshetra War, he marched forth with his army to join his nephews. On the way, Shalya was tricked by Duryodhana, who arranged a huge feast for Shalya and his men, entertaining him for hours. Impressed, Shalya was generous with his praise and asks to see Yudhishthira, who Shalya thought was his host. When Duryodhana revealed the treachery, Shalya is astounded but is compelled to grant a boon due to the hospitality. Unable to turn down Duryodhana's request to join the Kauravas, Shalya met the Pandavas and apologised for his mistake. Nakula and Sahadeva grew enraged, saying that Shalya had truly proven that Nakula and Sahadeva were not real brothers to the Pandavas, but only step-brothers. Yudhishthira quickly stepped in and reprimanded the twins, commanding that they were never to again cheapen their relationship by saying they were "step" brothers. At this point, Shalya realised that he had underestimated their brotherly bond. Yudhishthira promised to Shalya that he would kill him during the eve of the war.

Yudhisthira's plan against Karna 
Prior to the start of the war, Yudhishthira met with his elders on the Kaurava side, seeking their blessings. Shalya readily offered his blessings to Yudhishthira, wishing him victory. Yudhisthira feared  that Karna could single-handedly kill the Pandavas. In order to dissuade him from combat, Shalya was requested by Yudhishthira to heap praises on his brothers in order to infuriate Karna, to distract him on the field of battle.

1st-13th days

Though not spirited in his fight, Shalya confronted many great warriors during the war. On the first day, he attacks Yudishthira and snaps his bow. However, Yudishthira takes another bow and wounds Shalya. Shalya killed Uttara Kumara on the first day of the war. He killed the boy with his spear after a fantastic duel, and subsequently hailed his brave death. On the second day, his eldest son Madranjaya is killed by Virata as revenge for Uttara.

13th-17th days
On the 13th day, Shalya's sons Rukmangada and Rukmaratha were killed by Abhimanyu; Shalya himself is helpless against Abhimanyu's attacks. On the 14th day, he tries to stop Arjuna’s advance towards Jayadratha but is defeated; injured so badly that he cannot even sit down. During the night battle at the end of the day, he vanquishes Virata and makes him flee.

Karna's charioteer

On 16th day of battle, Karna defeated, but spared the lives of Nakula and Sahadeva, stating that they are younger and not his equals, therefore not deserving of death by his hands. He proceeded to clash with Arjuna, having previously promised Kunti that he would not attempt to slay any Pandava except Arjuna. During the course of the battle, Karna invoked the Ashwasena snake on his arrow and directed it towards Arjuna. Shalya interrupted him, encouraging Karna to aim at Arjuna's chest instead. Due to the deceptive nature of Shalya, Karna surmised that this advice must be inaccurate, and aimed the arrow towards Arjuna's head. Krishna drove Arjuna's chariot into the earth, saving Arjuna's life.

Being Karna's charioteer, Shalya grudgingly grows respect for Karna, admiring his skills, bravery, and ethics. On the seventeenth day, unarmed and on foot, Karna is killed by Arjuna. The nature of Karna's death fuels Shalya with Shalya felt immense remorse for Karna and hatred for Arjuna; he swears to fight on in his name on the eighteenth day of the war. Duryodhana subsequently named Shalya as the new commander-in-chief of the Kaurava forces.

Death 

After becoming named the new commander-in-chief, Shalya became impassioned to fight for the Kaurava cause. Krishna suggested that Yudhishthira should kill the powerful warrior, as the eldest Pandava was not a man of aggression and could meet Shalya's calm demeanour in battle. Yudishthira challenges Shalya and subsequently slays him in spear-combat. Honouring their word to Shalya, Nakula and Sahadeva ascended the throne of the Madra kingdom.

References

Characters in the Mahabharata